Bifrons is Latin for "two-faced" and may refer to:

Geography 
 Bifrons, an estate (hence also Bifrons Hill, Bifrons Road)  in Patrixbourne, Kent, England
 Bifrons (age), a subdivision of the Jurassic Lias Group named after the estate

Mythology 
 Janus, the god of beginnings and transitions in ancient Roman religion and mythology
 Bifrons (demon), in demonology, a demon, Earl of Hell, with at least six legions of demons under his command
 Bifrons (Dungeons & Dragons), a Duke of Hell in the service of Mephistopheles, in the Dungeons & Dragons roleplaying game